Iowa Straw Poll  may refer to:

 Iowa State Fair Straw Poll, also sometimes referred to as Iowa Straw Poll; first conducted in 2015
 Iowa Straw Poll (1979–2011), sponsored by the Iowa Republican Party and conducted from 1979 to 2011